Barium bromide is the chemical compound with the formula BaBr2. It is ionic in nature.

Structure and properties
BaBr2 crystallizes in the lead chloride (cotunnite) motif, giving white orthorhombic crystals that are deliquescent.

In aqueous solution BaBr2 behaves as a simple salt.

Solutions of barium bromide reacts with the sulfate salts to produce a solid precipitate of barium sulfate.
BaBr2  +    →  BaSO4  +  2 Br−
Similar reactions occur with oxalic acid, hydrofluoric acid, and phosphoric acid, giving solid precipitates of barium oxalate, fluoride, and phosphate, respectively.

Preparation
Barium bromide can be prepared by treating barium sulfide or barium carbonate with hydrobromic acid:
BaS  +  2 HBr  →  BaBr2  +  H2S
BaCO3  +  2 HBr  →  BaBr2  +  CO2 + H2O
Barium bromide crystallizes from concentrated aqueous solution in its dihydrate , BaBr2·2H2O.  Heating this dihydrate to 120 °C gives the anhydrous salt.

Uses
Barium bromide is a precursor to chemicals used in photography and to other bromides.
Historically, barium bromide was used to purify radium in a process of fractional crystallization devised by Marie Curie.  Since radium precipitates preferentially in a solution of barium bromide, the ratio of radium to barium in the precipitate would be higher than the ratio in the solution.

Safety
Barium bromide, along with other water-soluble barium salts (e.g. barium chloride), is toxic. However, there is no conclusive data available on its hazards.

In popular culture
The compound appears in the intro title card of Breaking Bad, where the title is replaced with "Br" and "Ba", the symbols of bromine and barium, respectively.

References

Bromides
Alkaline earth metal halides
Barium compounds